Deadliest Catch: Bloodline (sometimes shortened to Bloodline) is an American documentary and reality television series that premiered on April 14, 2020 on the Discovery Channel. Bloodline is a spin-off of Discovery Channel's Deadliest Catch. In contrast to the program's usual setting in the Bering Sea during crab fishing season, Bloodline is set in Hawaii. The first three season follows fishermen Josh Harris, his business partner Casey McManus (both captains of the Cornelia Marie on the Deadliest Catch series), and Jeff Silva as they investigate scribbles found on Hawaiian fishing charts left by Josh's late father, Phil Harris. Bloodline was launched the same day as the season 16 premiere episode of Deadliest Catch.

Premise 
As the boat Cornelia Marie was being remodeled, Josh Harris found Hawaiian fishing charts that his late father, Capt. Phil Harris, left behind. Josh and his business partner, Casey McManus, venture to the Hawaiian Kona Coast in search of ahi tuna and to learn about Phil's time spent there in the 1980s. While in Hawaii, Josh and Casey team up with a local commercial fisherman Jeff Silva for help in better understanding the coastal fishery, translating Phil's charts and notes, and guiding them on their new endeavor—catching tuna, each worth about $2,000. The hunt will also include barracuda, swordfish, and other underwater species. Johnathan Hillstrand, former co-captain of Deadliest Catchs Time Bandit, appears on the show and meets with Josh, Casey, and Jeff to help answer questions about Phil's possible motives on fishing in Hawaiian waters.

 Cast Main Josh Harris – Co-captain of the F/V Cornelia Marie, a Bering Sea crab fishing vessel featured in Deadliest Catch
 Casey McManus – Co-captain of the F/V Cornelia Marie featured in Deadliest Catch
 Jeff Silva – Local veteran fishermanRecurring Johnathan Hillstrand – Captain of the F/V Time Bandit featured in Deadliest CatchOther appearances'''
 Sig Hansen – Captain of the F/V Northwestern featured in Deadliest Catch''
 Jim McManus – Casey's father
 Larry Silva – Jeff's father
 John Kauhaihau – Veteran fisherman
 Chuck Leslie – Veteran fisherman
 Kolina Silva – Jeff's wife

Series overview

Episodes

Season 1 (2020)

Season 2 (2021) 
All episodes were only available on Discovery+, except the season premiere, which was also aired on Discovery Channel.

Season 3 (2022)

Specials

Deadliest Catch: Bloodline pre-premiere releases 
The pre-premiere (PP) releases' air times range from five to nine minutes each. The "teasers" are not considered to be pilots or the first episodes of the season.

Deadliest Catch: Bloodline

See also 
 Deadliest Catch vessels

References

External links 
  at go.discovery.com
 
 

2020 American television series debuts
2020s American reality television series
English-language television shows
Discovery Channel original programming
Television series by Original Productions
Television shows set in Hawaii
Deadliest Catch
American television spin-offs
Reality television spin-offs